Martin Walt is a professor of electrical engineering at Stanford University. He specializes in magnetospheric physics. He is also the father of Stephen Walt, a professor at Harvard University's John F. Kennedy School of Government.

Education
He received his B.S. (Physics) from California Institute of Technology (1950),
his M.S. (Physics) from  University of Wisconsin–Madison (1951) and 
his Ph.D. (Physics), University of Wisconsin–Madison (1953).
His graduate education was in experimental nuclear physics.

Career
He worked for 1953–1956 at Los Alamos Scientific Laboratory.
From 1956 to 1992 he worked for the Research laboratory of the Lockheed Missiles and Space Company.
Since 1993 he has been at Stanford University.

Honors and awards
He received the Wisconsin Alumni Research Foundation Fellowship in 1951 and Atomic Energy Commission Fellowship for 1952–1953.
He is a Fellow of the American Physical Society and the American Geophysical Union.

References

External links
Martin Walt (Official)
Publications
PIXIE
POLAR
SEPS

Year of birth missing (living people)
Living people
Stanford University faculty
American electrical engineers
21st-century American physicists
University of Wisconsin–Madison alumni
California Institute of Technology alumni
Fellows of the American Physical Society
Fellows of the American Geophysical Union
Lockheed Missiles and Space Company people